ECA (formerly the Electrical Contractors' Association) is the main trade association for companies involved in electrotechnical and other technical engineering projects in England, Northern Ireland and Wales. In 2022 it had some 2600 registered members - companies who collectively generated annual revenues of over £6billion (e.g. the UK electrical contracting industry is worth in excess of £10 billion). ECA also has associate categories open to industry manufacturers, distributors, educators, clients and specifiers who wish to engage and collaborate with members.

ECA is currently either leading or active across a range of built environment, building, construction, maintenance, and infrastructure issues, and in particular those relating to electrical engineering, mainly in the commercial, industrial and public sectors, as well as the domestic arena. Key areas of activity include: technical; standards; skills; health and safety; renewable, energy efficiency and other energy installations; supply chain procurement and payment; digitalisation; and employment issues.

History

Founded in 1901, the ECA represents contractors who design, install, inspect, test, monitor, and maintain electrical and electronic equipment and services. It was incorporated on 19 April 1916. ECA became the official trading name of 'Electrical Contractors' Association' in autumn 2017.

Industry improvements

The ECA played a particularly important part in the 1920s and 1930s when electric power was introduced to most houses. Before this time, and the formation of the National Grid, electricity was supplied at different voltages and frequencies.

Today, the ECA actively represents the electrical and electronic contracting sectors, taking a leading role in both technical standards (notably BS 7671) and professional competencies in both the domestic and commercial sectors.

It has diversified to cover not just electrical engineering, but also fire and security, datacomms, energy provision, building management systems, audiovisual, temporary installations, and other services.

The Fire and Security Association (FSA) consists of members of ECA and ECA's Scottish counterpart, SELECT.

With the charity Electrical Safety First, ECA owns Certsure LLP, which trades under certification brand NICEIC.

With Unite the Union (which includes members of the former Electrical, Electronic, Telecommunications and Plumbing Union), ECA is a founder and partner in the Joint Industry Board (JIB), which oversees wage negotiations in the industry. JIB also runs the Electrotechnical Certification Scheme (ECS), which administers site cards for individuals.

Functions
The ECA has three main aims:

To provide support services to its Registered Members. These include advice on: technical issues, employment, health and safety, contracts, legal, energy solutions and skills.
To work with regulatory bodies, government and other opinion formers to build an efficient and sustainable industry, based on high standards of training and practice.
 To form strategic relationships with those who specify electrical and other engineering services to enhance the profile and promote the use of Registered Members of all sizes.

It represents the views of specialist electrical and other engineering companies within contractor group Build UK and via Actuate UK. It holds a range of electrical industry conferences and other events, including the ECA Industry Awards and ECA Edmundson Apprentice of the Year Award annually.

Publications
It produces the ECA Today magazine every quarter. This is supplemented by ECA Today  online - www.ecatoday.co.uk - which provides daily industry-related news and other content.

In addition to free material for its members, the ECA also provides free checklists for commercial clients on selected topics, such as low carbon energy.

Location
ECA moved from its previously long established HQ in Bayswater, West London, via temporary premises in Hammersmith, to newly joint-owned offices in an 'industry hub' in St Katharine Docks, near London's Tower Bridge on 6 November 2017. Other bodies based in the hub include BEAMA, BESA (joint premises owner), Electrical Industries Charity, Electrical Distributors' Association and Voltimum.

Regional offices
 Central South - Basingstoke
 East - Bury St Edmunds
 East Midlands - Penkridge 
 Greater London - London
 North East - Newton Aycliffe
 North West - Warrington
 Northern Ireland - Belfast
 South Wales - Cardiff
 West Midlands - Penkridge
 South East - Sevenoaks
 West / South West - Somerset

See also
 International Electrotechnical Commission
 British Approvals Service for Cables

References

External links
 ECA website
 EuropeOn - European Association of Electrical Contractors

1901 establishments in the United Kingdom
Electrical safety in the United Kingdom
Electrical trades organizations
Electric power in the United Kingdom
Trade associations based in the United Kingdom
Organizations established in 1901